Richlands Historic District is a national historic district located at Richlands, Tazewell County, Virginia. The district encompasses 91 contributing buildings in the central business district of the town of Richlands.  It includes residential, commercial, and institutional buildings dating from the late-19th to mid-20th centuries.  Notable buildings include the W.B.F. White and Sons Hardware building (c. 1892), Bank of Richlands (c. 1890), Norfolk and Western Railroad Section House (c. 1889), First Christian Church (1908), First United Methodist Church, and Richlands Presbyterian Church. Also located in the district is the separately listed Clinch Valley Coal and Iron Company Office.

was listed on the National Register of Historic Places in 2007.

References

Historic districts in Tazewell County, Virginia
National Register of Historic Places in Tazewell County, Virginia
Historic districts on the National Register of Historic Places in Virginia